Marcel Adamczyk (5 January 1935 – 10 February 2023) was a French footballer who played as a defender.

Career
Born in Giraumont, Meurthe-et-Moselle on 5 January 1935, Adamczyk played junior football alongside his brother for AS Giraumont. He distinguished himself in a 1953 Coupe de France match against Red Star. He then left to play for Metz but refused his professional contract and returned to Giraumont. He became a professional in 1960 after signing with FC Nancy. He was also selected to play in a match for the France national B team against Italy. With Nancy, he reached the final of the 1961–62 Coupe de France, which resulted in a 1–0 loss to Saint-Étienne.

In 1963, Adamczyk left Nancy and began playing for Lille. That year, he played in his only match for the France national team against Bulgaria in Sofia. After his professional career, he played for the corporate team of Bergerat-Monnoyeur, with whom he played in the final of the Coupe nationale corpo in 1970.

Death
Adamczyk died on 10 February 2023, at the age of 88.

References

1935 births
2023 deaths
French footballers
French people of Polish descent
Association football defenders
France international footballers
FC Metz players
Lille OSC players
FC Nancy players
People from Meurthe-et-Moselle